The E1 Expressway or Peshawar-Torkham Expressway (Urdu: 
) is a proposed controlled-access expressway which will link the border-town of Torkham to Peshawar in Khyber Pakhtunkhwa, Pakistan.

Route

Construction

See also
 E75 Murree Expressway
 E35 Hazara Expressway

References

External links
 National Highway Authority
 Pakistan National Highways & Motorway Police

1
1
Khyber Pass Economic Corridor